2nd Politburo may refer to:
2nd Central Bureau of the Chinese Communist Party
2nd Politburo of the Communist Party of Cuba, 1980–1986
2nd Politburo of the Party of Labour of Albania
2nd Politburo of the Communist Party of Czechoslovakia
2nd Politburo of the Socialist Unity Party of Germany, 1947–1950
2nd Politburo of the Polish United Workers' Party, 1954–1959
2nd Politburo of the Romanian Communist Party, 1922–1924
2nd Politburo of the Lao People's Revolutionary Party, 1972–1982
2nd Politburo of the Workers' Party of Vietnam, 1951–1960
2nd Politburo of the Communist Party of Yugoslavia, 1920–1926
2nd Politburo of the Hungarian Communist Party, 1930–1946
2nd Political Committee of the Workers' Party of Korea, 1948–1956